Monochroa tetragonella, the saltern neb, is a moth of the family Gelechiidae. It is found in Scandinavia, the Baltic region, Great Britain, the Netherlands and Russia (including the Altai and Transbaikalia). The habitat consists of saltmarshes.

The wingspan is 9–11 mm. Adults are on wing from June to July.

The larvae feed on Lysimachia maritima. They mine the leaves of their host plant. In autumn, the larvae mine out a number of upper leaves, migrating through the stem from one leaf to another. After overwintering, the larvae bore the stem of their host plant. The larvae have a crimson reddish body and an ochreous-yellow head.

References

Moths described in 1885
Monochroa
Moths of Europe